Eugene Ferguson may refer to:

 Gene Ferguson (born 1947), retired American football player
 Eugene S. Ferguson (1916–2004), engineer and historian of technology